Ivory is an off-white color named after, and derived from, the material made from the tusks and teeth of certain animals, such as the elephant and the walrus. It has a very slight tint of yellow.

The color is often associated with purity and elegance. In Western culture, it is also associated with weddings and other formal occasions. In Eastern cultures, ivory has been used for centuries in the creation of decorative objects and religious artifacts, such as Buddha statues and other sculptures. The cultural acceptance of the use of ivory as a material has declined over time, with the practice being outlawed in much of the world.

The first recorded use of ivory as a color name in English was in 1385.

The color "ivory" was included as one of the X11 colors when they were formulated in 1987.

Ivory in nature

Plants
The ivory-colored cymbidium is a species of orchid.

Birds
 Ivory is used adjectivally in the names of several birds to describe their appearance, including the ivory gull, ivory-backed woodswallow, ivory-billed aracari, ivory-billed woodcreeper, ivory-billed woodpecker and ivory-breasted pitta.

See also
 RAL 1014 Ivory
 List of colors
 X11 color names

References

Ivory
Shades of white

Bird colours